The 1956 Dutch TT was the second race of the 1956 Motorcycle Grand Prix season. It took place on the weekend of 30 June 1956 at the Assen circuit.

500 cc classification

350 cc classification

250 cc classification

125 cc classification

Sidecar classification

References

Dutch TT
Dutch
Tourist Trophy